AB Addo (Aktiebolaget Addo) was a Swedish engineering company which manufactured office machines. The company, based in Malmö, was founded in 1918. In 1966, it was incorporated into Facit, where it remained as a subsidiary until the early 1980s. Its products consisted mainly of adding machines, calculators, accounting machines, and data processing equipment.

References

Defunct companies of Sweden
Companies based in Malmö
Manufacturing companies established in 1918
Swedish companies established in 1918
Companies disestablished in 1966
1966 disestablishments in Sweden